The Chapel of the Incarnation is an L-shaped church building of the Mission style. It is located at 14070 Brandywine Rd., Brandywine, Prince George's County, Maryland.

The cornerstone was laid in September 1916, and the chapel opened for Mass early in 1917.  The chapel's architect, William J. Palmer, who designed numerous residences and churches in Washington, D.C., prepared the plans and specifications for the church and attached Parish Hall. The Mission style may have been deemed appropriate to the church's status as a "mission chapel," or offshoot, of St. Thomas' Church in Croom, Maryland.

The chapel is constructed of poured-in-form concrete covered with a coarse pebble-filled stucco to resemble adobe. It is a one-story cross-gabled building with the entrance through the lower-gabled narthex. The structure is highlighted by a shaped parapet and bell tower. The interior is distinguished by its original altar balustrade and pulpit, and an ancient stone baptismal font brought from a church in England.

It was listed on the National Register of Historic Places in 1988.

References

External links
, including photo in 1999, at Maryland Historical Trust website

Churches in Prince George's County, Maryland
Episcopal church buildings in Maryland
Churches on the National Register of Historic Places in Maryland
Churches completed in 1917
National Register of Historic Places in Prince George's County, Maryland